Melrose Sevens is an annual rugby sevens event held by Melrose Rugby Club, at The Greenyards in Melrose, Scotland. It is the oldest rugby sevens competition in the world, dating back to 1883 when the tournament was suggested by former Melrose player Ned Haig. English side London Scottish are the current champions after beating Edinburgh Accies 29–12 in the 2019 final to win the event for the first time since 1965.

History
Held every April, the tournament is part of the Kings of the Sevens competition, and has attracted teams from as far afield as Japan, Hong Kong, Uruguay and South Africa.

From 2018 the playing time in the final was cut from twenty minutes to fourteen minutes which is in line with the standard match time.

In September 2019 the organisers had set out plans for the Melrose Sevens to relaunch as a four-day festival of music and rugby. The 2020 event was however postponed and eventually cancelled due to the coronavirus pandemic. There was no event held in 2021 due to the pandemic.

Media coverage
Domestically, the tournament is broadcast live on BBC Scotland and BBC Online, and locally, from the first tie right through to the final, on Radio Borders.

Past winners

Number of wins

 Hawick (28)
 Gala (15)
 Melrose (12)
 Watsonians (10)
 Kelso (7)
 Heriot's FP (7)
 Jed-Forest (4)
 Boroughmuir (3)
 Edinburgh Accies (3)
  London Scottish (3)
 Royal HSFP (3)
 Stewart's College FP (2)
  Stellenbosch University (2)
  Loughborough Colleges (2)
  Harlequins (2)
  Saracens (2)
 Glasgow Warriors (2)

See also
 Melrose RFC
 Borders Sevens Circuit
 Scottish Rugby Union

References

External links
 
 Melrose 7s - Roll of Honour Rugby7.com

Rugby sevens competitions in Scotland
Rugby union in the Scottish Borders
Melrose, Scottish Borders